Mean Streak or Meanstreak may refer to:

 Mean Streak, a roller coaster formerly located at Cedar Point amusement park in Sandusky, Ohio, U.S., converted and reopened as Steel Vengeance
 Mean Streak (album), a 1983 album by Y&T
 Mean Streak (marker), a marker made by Sanford
 Meanstreak (band), an American thrash metal band
 Meanstreak (character), a fictional character created by Marvel Comics
 Mean Streak, a version of the Kawasaki Vulcan 1600 motorcycle
 "Mean Streak" (song), a 1959 single by Cliff Richard and the Drifters
 "Mean Streak", a song by Deep Purple from their 1984 album Perfect Strangers
 "Mean Streak", a song by Gamma from their 1980 album Gamma 2
 "Meanstreak", a song by AC/DC from their 1988 album Blow Up Your Video
 "Mean Streak", an episode of the sitcom The King of Queens